The 2007–08 Major Indoor Soccer League season was the seventh and final season for the league.  The regular season started on October 19, 2007, and ended on April 5, 2008.

League Standings

Playoffs

Scoring leaders

GP = Games Played, G = Goals, A = Assists, Pts = Points

Source:

League awards
 Most Valuable Player: Greg Howes, Milwaukee
 Defender of the Year: Genoni Martinez, Monterrey
 Rookie of the Year: Frederico Moojen, New Jersey
 Goalkeeper of the Year: Sagu, Baltimore
 Coach of the Year: Keith Tozer, Milwaukee
 Championship Series Finals MVP: Denison Cabral, Baltimore

Sources:

All-MISL Teams

Source:

All-Rookie Team

Source:

References

External links
Major Indoor Soccer League II (RSSSF)

Major Indoor Soccer League (2001–2008)
Major
Major
2007–08